Lea Seong is a South Korean born fashion designer.

Education
Seong graduated from Chung-Ang University in South Korea and has a bachelor's degree from Parsons School of Design in New York City.

Career
Combining both Asian and Western styles, she created her own fashion brand "Lea Seong" in Shanghai in 2008. Since then, she has presented her collections at China Fashion Week. Seong has worked at Calvin Klein in New York to becoming the first foreign member of the China Fashion Designers Association. She has also been granted the China Fashion Week S/S 2009 and S/S 2010 Special Designer's Award.

Designs
Incorporating milk fabric into her designs, she made her debut in South Korea with her women's wear collection at the Pret-a-Porter Busan in late November, 2009. Her achievement has upgraded her as the Officer of Korea Model Association for International Cultural Cooperation.

References

Year of birth missing (living people)
Living people
Chung-Ang University alumni
Parsons School of Design alumni
South Korean expatriates in China
South Korean fashion designers
South Korean women fashion designers